Roland J. Teske, S.J. (October 29, 1934 - May 18, 2015) was a Roman Catholic priest member of the Jesuit order.  Teske was also a medievalist and philosopher and Professor Emeritus of Philosophy at Marquette University.  He published several books about medieval philosophy and theology, and translated and prepared English translations of their work, specializing in St. Augustine's philosophical and religious views and the work of the later philosopher William of Auvergne, Bishop of Paris.

Bibliography

Scholarly English translations of St. Augustine
On Genesis: Two Books on Genesis against the Manichees; and, On the Literal Interpretation of Genesis, an Unfinished Book. (Translation of: De Genesi contra Manichaeos and De Genesi ad litteram imperfectum liber.)  Washington, D.C.: Catholic University of America Press, 1990. 
 with John E. Rotelle Augustine, Saint Bishop of Hippo Priscillianists and Origenists ; Arian sermon ; Answer to an Arian sermon ; Debate with Maximinus ; Answer to Maximinus ; Answer to an enemy of the Law and the Prophets OCLC 34165347
 with John E. Rotelle, Answer to the Pelagians. II, Marriage and desire ; Answer to the two letters of the Pelagians ; Answer to Julian 
 with John E. Rotelle, Answer to the Pelagians. III, Unfinished work in answer to Julian Hyde Park, N.Y. : New City Press, 1999 
 with John E. Rotelle, Answer to the Pelagians. IV, To the monks of Hadrumetum and Provence Publisher:	Hyde Park, N.Y. : New City Press, 1999 
 with Boniface Ramsey, The Manichean Debate. Hyde Park, N.Y.: New City Press, 2006.

Scholarly English translations of other philosophers
 Henry of Ghent. Quodlibetal Questions on Free Will. Milwaukee, Wis: Marquette University Press, 1993. 
 William of Auvergne The Trinity, or, The first principle Publisher: Milwaukee, Wis. : Marquette University Press, 1989   
 William of Auvergne, On the Virtues Part One of On the Virtues and Vices. Milwaukee, Wis: Marquette University Press, 2009.
 William of Auvergne, The Universe of Creatures. Milwaukee: Marquette University Press, 1998.
 William of Auvergne, The providence of God regarding the universe : part three of the first principal part of The universe of creatures  Milwaukee, Wis. : Marquette University Press, 2007.
 William of Auvergne,The immortality of the soul = De immortalitate animae Milwaukee, Wis. : Marquette University Press, 1991
 Roberto Francesco Romolo Bellarmino  (with  John Patrick Donnelly), Spiritual writings New York : Paulist Press, 1989.

Monographs
 To Know God and the Soul: Essays on the Thought of Saint Augustine. Washington, D.C.: Catholic University of America Press, 2008.
 Studies in the Philosophy of William of Auvergne, Bishop of Paris (1228-1249) Milwaukee, Wis. : Marquette University Press, 2006

Edited volumes
 co-edited with Lienhard, Joseph T. and Earl C. Muller, Augustine: Presbyter Factus Sum. New York: P. Lang, 1993.

References

1934 births
2015 deaths
Marquette University faculty
American medievalists
Catholic philosophers
20th-century American Jesuits
21st-century American Jesuits